Jimmy Connors was the defending champion but lost in the quarterfinals to Greg Holmes.

Larry Stefanki won in the final 6–1, 6–4, 3–6, 6–3 against David Pate.

Seeds
The top eight seeds received a bye into the second round.

  Jimmy Connors (quarterfinals)
  Henrik Sundström (second round)
  Aaron Krickstein (quarterfinals)
  Johan Kriek (second round)
  Joakim Nyström (second round)
  Tomáš Šmíd (third round)
  Juan Aguilera (second round)
  José Higueras (third round)
  Libor Pimek (semifinals)
  Brad Gilbert (third round)
  Guillermo Vilas (first round)
  Scott Davis (third round)
  John Fitzgerald (first round)
  Greg Holmes (semifinals)
  Terry Moor (first round)
  Guy Forget (first round)

Draw

Finals

Top half

Section 1

Section 2

Bottom half

Section 3

Section 4

References
 1985 Pilot Pen Classic Draw - Men's Singles

Pilot Pen Classic - Singles